Muhammad Ridhwan bin Mohd Nazri (born 5 July 2000) is a Malaysian footballer who plays as a midfielder for Kuala Lumpur City.

Honours
Kuala Lumpur City
 Malaysia Cup: 2021
 AFC Cup runner-up: 2022

References

External links
 

2000 births
Living people
Malaysian footballers
Malaysian people of Malay descent
Association football midfielders
Malaysia Super League players